United States of Al is an American television sitcom created by David Goetsch and Maria Ferrari. It stars Adhir Kalyan and Parker Young, with Elizabeth Alderfer, Kelli Goss, Dean Norris, and Farrah Mackenzie in supporting roles. The series follows Al (Kalyan), an interpreter from Afghanistan who moves to Columbus, Ohio, with his friend Riley (Young), a veteran of the United States Marine Corps. Executive produced by Chuck Lorre, it is produced and distributed by Warner Bros. Television Studios.

A television pilot for the series was announced in October 2019, with production beginning the following year. In November 2020, CBS gave the project a series order, scheduling it to premiere on April 1, 2021. Released to mixed reviews, United States of Al was criticized for its humor, use of antiquated tropes, and casting of an Indo-South African actor to play an Afghan lead with an inauthentic accent. However, the show was praised by some for its attempts to diversify television, and for the cultural representation of its main character. At the 73rd Primetime Emmy Awards, the show's pilot received a nomination for Outstanding Production Design for a Narrative Program. In May 2021, the series was renewed for a second and final season which premiered on October 7, 2021. In May 2022, the series was canceled after two seasons.

Premise
The series follows the friendship between Riley, a combat veteran, and Awalmir (Al), an interpreter from Afghanistan who helped the former while he served in the Marines. As they readjust to their normal lives in Columbus, Ohio, Al moves in with Riley and meets his father Art. He later learns Riley is going through a divorce with his wife Vanessa, who has custody of their only daughter Hazel. Trying to help his friend, who is also dealing with PTSD, Al decides to make it his mission to get Riley and Vanessa back together.

Cast and characters

Main

 Adhir Kalyan as Awalmir Karimi, an interpreter from Afghanistan (born in Kandahar and moved to Kabul) who also goes by Al
 Parker Young as Riley Dugan, a Marine combat veteran trying to readjust to civilian life in Ohio
 Elizabeth Alderfer as Lizzie Dugan, the daughter of Art and the younger sister of Riley
 Kelli Goss as Vanessa, Riley's estranged wife and the mother of their daughter
 Dean Norris as Art Dugan, a veteran and the father of Riley and Lizzie
 Farrah Mackenzie as Hazel Dugan, Riley and Vanessa's daughter She is similar to her father who is a tomboy and rebellious.

Recurring
 Brian Thomas Smith as Freddy, Vanessa's Canadian boyfriend
 Rachel Bay Jones as Lois, Art's new love interest
 Azita Ghanizada as Ariana (season 2; guest season 1), Kasim's daughter and Al's love interest
 Amanda Payton as Holly, Riley's girlfriend
 Blake Clark as Wayne (season 2), Riley's therapist
 John Ross Bowie as Professor Brett Williams (season 2), Al's university professor and Lizzie's love interest
 Jayma Mays as Cindy (season 2)

Guest
 Patrick Cage as Michael, Lizzie's late fiancé
 Zarmina Hamidi as Gul Bashra, Al's strict mother
 Wali Habib as Zubair, Al's cousin
 Sitara Attai as Hassina, Al's sister
 Susan Ruttan as Mrs. Foster, Al's neighbor
 Riki Lindhome as Chloe, a car dealership manager who sells Al a car
 Zadran Wali as Kasim, the owner of a restaurant Al visits
 Nikki Crawford as Barbara, Art's date
 Patrick Fischler as Clint, a rude client
 Fahim Anwar as Mo (season 2)
 Clyde Kusatsu as Doctor Tanaka (season 2)
 Myko Olivier as Todd (season 2)
 Johnny Ray Gill as Badger (season 2)
 Cameron Elie as Nate (season 2)
 Jimmy Walker, Jr. as Walt (season 2)
 Hermie Castillo as Derek (season 2)
 Erica Hanrahan as Lyla (season 2)
 Dayne Jarrah as Danny (season 2)
 Angel Laketa Moore as Mrs. Ro (season 2)
 Deniz Akdeniz as Dirk (season 2)
 Artoun Nazareth as Luke (season 2)
 Ahan Das Chowdhury as Sanjay (season 2)
 George Sharperson as Gus (season 2)

Episodes

Season 1 (2021)

Season 2 (2021–22)

Production

Development and casting

On October 10, 2019, it was reported that a television pilot titled United States of Al from Chuck Lorre, David Goetsch, and Maria Ferrari had received a large production commitment from CBS. In December, Adhir Kalyan and Parker Young were cast as the leading characters on the show, with Dean Norris, Kelli Goss, and Elizabeth Alderfer joining the series the following year, and Farrah Mackenzie being cast soon after. On joining the comedy series after his main role in the drama series Breaking Bad, Norris explained that he had met Lorre while working on six episodes for The Big Bang Theory. In November 2020, on Veterans Day, CBS gave the project a series order, scheduling it to premiere on April 1, 2021, for the 2020–21 United States network television season. On creating the show, executive producer Reza Aslan said:

In May 2021, Brian Thomas Smith was cast in the first recurring role confirmed for the series. That same month, Deadline Hollywood predicted that the chances of the show being renewed depended on the status of B Positive, another CBS series from Lorre. On May 15, 2021, CBS renewed both B Positive and United States of Al for second and final seasons. In June, it was announced that Rachel Bay Jones would star in a recurring role. In October, it was reported that Azita Ghanizada had been promoted to recurring. The second season premiered on October 7, 2021. On May 11, 2022, CBS canceled the series after two seasons.

Filming and controversies
A co-production between Chuck Lorre Productions and Warner Bros. Television Studios, the first season of United States of Al began production in a television studio located on 4000 Warner Boulevard in Burbank, California. Filming for the pilot took place in October 2020 with director Mark Cendrowski, while later episodes were filmed simultaneously with its broadcast a few weeks in advance.

Prior to airing, some of the show's promotional material received negative feedback. In particular, critics called out the casting of a South-African-born Indian actor to play an Afghan lead and his use of an inauthentic accent. Aslan defended the show on social media, stating in his response that the show has two Afghan-American and one Afghan writer, as well as two Iranian-American producers. Goetsch added that the show's development included extensive interviews with Afghan refugees and U.S. veterans. On August 16, 2021, an episode rerun of the show was removed from CBS' schedule in the midst of the 2021 Taliban offensive. In a statement, a CBS spokesperson told Vice that the episode was not aired "out of sensitivity to current events," and did not respond to questions surrounding the future of the series.

Production on the second season began in August 2021. On September 9, 2021, CBS Entertainment President Kelly Kahl said the series would address the withdrawal of United States troops from Afghanistan in its rewritten opening episode and that they had "been working hard to find the appropriate tone as the show moves forward." In a guest column for The Hollywood Reporter, military consultant and writer Chase Millsap said the staff for United States of Al, including seven veterans and five Afghans, did all they could to "help many Afghans escape the Taliban. Narratives have power. They help define who we are as a nation." Filming for the second season concluded on March 25, 2022.

Reception

Critical response

On review aggregator Rotten Tomatoes, the series holds an approval rating of 31% based on 13 reviews, with an average rating of 4.4/10. The website's critical consensus states, "United States of Al is well-meaning in its ambitions, but its limp humor and the one-dimensionality of its titular character proves that the road to dud sitcom can be paved with good intentions." On Metacritic, it has a weighted average score of 52 out of 100, based on 11 critics, indicating "mixed or average reviews".

In initial contemporary reviews, United States of Al received mostly negative feedback. However, the Los Angeles Times journalist Lorraine Ali examined reviews from several critics, and summarized them as illustrating "the minefield that exists around good-intentioned efforts to diversify scripted television" due to their ignoring of the cultural representation of the main character and the show's attempts to diversify television, calling the reviews "damaging to future representations of Muslims".

Daniel Fienberg, writing for The Hollywood Reporter, shared his dislike for "the writers' choices for Al", referring to it as "a bad mixture". From TV Guide, Diane Gordon gave the show only 2 out of 5 stars; her criticism leaned toward the show's fish out of water attempts at comedy she found to be "cheap and half-hearted".
Roxana Hadadi from RogerEbert.com criticized the series and its creators' in using antiquated tropes in attempting to be comedic. Caroline Framke from Variety also gave remarks to the show's writing, stating that the show "works so hard to make its Afghan protagonist palatable that it neglects to give him any complexity."

Afghan journalist Ali Latifi shared his criticism of the show in an op-ed for Business Insider and said "it's all flat characters, and cheap, uninspired jokes." While giving praise to Lorre's television series The Big Bang Theory, he also shared a quote from a conversation with Afghan-American social rights activist Mariam Wardak, who he quoted as saying "rather than showing Afghan interpreters as brave men who are putting their lives on the line and are risking being ostracized in their community, we have a short, scrawny awkward brown man standing next to this GI Joe." The Afghan-American Foundation criticized the show's casting of the lead role while they also applauded the show's inclusion of Afghan-American writers as "commendable and unprecedented," hoping the show leads to further thoughtful representations of Afghan-Americans.

Ratings

Overall

Season 1

Season 2

Notes

References

External links
 

2020s American sitcoms
2021 American television series debuts
2022 American television series endings
Afghanistan in fiction
CBS original programming
English-language television shows
Television series about families
Television shows about the United States Marine Corps
Television series by Warner Bros. Television Studios
Television shows featuring audio description
Television shows set in Columbus, Ohio